Federico Gay (16 July 1896 — 15 April 1989) was an Italian professional road bicycle racer, who won four stages in the 1924 Giro d'Italia, and one stage in the 1922 Tour de France. He rode the Tour de France twice, finishing 11th in 1922 and 10th in 1925. His best result in the Giro d'Italia was in 1924, when he finished second in the overall classification. He competed in two events at the 1920 Summer Olympics.

He was born and died in Turin.

Major results

1921
Milano–Torino
1922
Tour de France:
Winner stage 13
1924
Giro d'Italia:
Winner stages 2, 3, 5 and 6
2nd place overall classification
Milano–Torino
1925
Zürich-Berlin
1932
 national track stayers championship

References

External links

Official Tour de France results for Federico Gay

1896 births
1989 deaths
Cyclists from Turin
Italian male cyclists
Italian Tour de France stage winners
Cyclists at the 1920 Summer Olympics
Olympic cyclists of Italy